Julia, Princess of Battenberg (born Julia Therese Salomea Hauke;  – 19 September 1895) was the wife of Prince Alexander of Hesse and by Rhine, the third son of Louis II, Grand Duke of Hesse. The daughter of a Polish general of German descent, she was not of princely origin. She became a lady-in-waiting to Marie of Hesse, wife of the future Emperor Alexander II and a sister of Prince Alexander of Hesse and by Rhine, whom she married, having met him in the course of her duties. The marriage of social unequals was deemed morganatic, but the Duke of Hesse gave her her own title of nobility as Princess of Battenberg. She was the mother of Alexander, Prince of Bulgaria, and is an ancestor of Charles III and to the current generations of the Spanish royal family.

Life

Hauke was born in Warsaw, Congress Poland, then ruled in personal union by the Emperor of the Russian Empire. She was the daughter of Hans Moritz Hauke, a Polish general of German descent. Her mother, Sophie, was the daughter of Polish doctor Franz Leopold Lafontaine.

Her father fought in Napoleon's Polish Legions in Austria, Italy, Germany, and the Peninsular War. After his service in the army of the Duchy of Warsaw from 1809 to 1814, he entered the ranks of the army of Congress Poland, and was promoted to general in 1828. Recognizing his abilities, Emperor Nicholas I appointed him Deputy Minister of War of Congress Poland and on 4 May 1829 made him a hereditary Count von Hauke. In the November Uprising of 1830, led by rebelling army cadets, Grand Duke Constantine, Poland's Russian governor, managed to escape, but Julia's father was shot dead by the cadets on a Warsaw street. Her mother died of shock shortly afterwards, and their children were made wards of the Emperor.

Hauke served as lady-in-waiting to Empress Marie Alexandrovna, wife of the future Emperor Alexander II and a sister of Prince Alexander of Hesse and by Rhine. She met Prince Alexander while performing her duties at court in St. Petersburg. The Emperor did not approve of a courtship between her and his son's brother-in-law, so the two arranged to leave St. Petersburg. By the time Julia and Alexander were able to marry, she was six months pregnant with their first child, Marie. They were married on 28 October 1851 in Breslau in Prussian Silesia (now called Wrocław and in Poland).

Since she was not considered equal for royal marriage purposes, her children did not qualify for succession to the throne of Hesse and by Rhine. Her marriage was declared to be morganatic after the birth of her first son. Her husband's brother, Grand Duke Louis III of Hesse-Darmstadt, made her Countess of Battenberg in 1851, with the style of Illustrious Highness. In 1858, she was elevated to Princess of Battenberg, with the style of Serene Highness. Battenberg became the name of a morganatic branch of the Grand Ducal Family of Hesse.

Hauke converted to Lutheranism on 12 May 1875. Prior to her conversion she frequently visited Orthodox and Byzantine Catholic churches throughout Hesse, often traveling great distances. Her religion was openly criticized by members of her husband's family until her conversion. Her children were baptized Lutheran. She died at Heiligenberg Castle on 19 September 1895.

Children
There were five children of the marriage, all princes and princesses of Battenberg:
 Princess Marie of Battenberg (1852–1923), married in 1871 Gustav, Prince of Erbach-Schönberg (d. 1908), with issue.
 Prince Louis of Battenberg (1854–1921), created first Marquess of Milford Haven in 1917, married in 1884 Princess Victoria of Hesse and by Rhine (1863–1950), with issue (including Princess Andrew of Greece and Denmark, Queen Louise of Sweden, and the 1st Earl Mountbatten of Burma). In 1917, he and his children gave up their German titles and took the surname Mountbatten. He was the maternal grandfather of Prince Philip.
 Prince Alexander of Battenberg (1857–1893), created reigning Prince of Bulgaria in 1879, abdicated in Bulgaria and created Count of Hartenau, married morganatically in 1889 Johanna Loisinger (1865–1951), his issue being Counts von Hartenau.
 Prince Henry of Battenberg (1858–1896), married in 1885 Princess Beatrice of the United Kingdom (1857–1944), with issue (including Princess Victoria Eugenie of Battenberg later Queen of Spain). His children resided in the UK and became lords and ladies with the surname Mountbatten in 1917 (see "Name change" below). His eldest son was created the first Marquess of Carisbrooke in 1917.
 Prince Francis Joseph of Battenberg (1861–1924), married in 1897 Princess Anna of Montenegro (1874–1971), with no issue.

Descendants change name to Mountbatten 
Julia's eldest son, Ludwig (Louis) of Battenberg, became a British subject, and during World War I, due to anti-German sentiment prevalent at the time, anglicised his name to Mountbatten (a literal translation of the German Battenberg), as did his nephews, the sons of Prince Henry and Princess Beatrice. The members of this branch of the family also renounced all German titles and were granted peerages by their cousin King George V of the United Kingdom: Prince Louis became the 1st Marquess of Milford Haven, while Prince Alexander, Prince Henry's eldest son, became the 1st Marquess of Carisbrooke.

Honours 

 :
 Military Medical Cross, 26 March 1871
 Commemorative Medal for the French Campaign in 1870/71 (for non-combatants)
 Dame of the Grand Ducal Hessian Order of the Golden Lion, 1 January 1883
 :
 Dame of Honour of the Order of Theresa
 Cross of Merit, 1st Class for 1870/71
 :
 Dame Grand Cross of the Imperial Order of Saint Catherine
 Red Cross Medal, 1st Class

Ancestry

See also
 Hauke-Bosak family

References

 Almanach de Gotha, Gotha 1931
 Eckhart G. Franz, Das Haus Hessen: Eine europäische Familie, Kohlhammer Verlag, Stuttgart 2005 (S. 164–170), 

1825 births
1895 deaths
Nobility from Warsaw
Morganatic spouses of German royalty
Battenberg family
House of Hesse-Darmstadt
Ladies-in-waiting from the Russian Empire
Emigrants from the Russian Empire to Germany
German princesses
Converts to Lutheranism from Roman Catholicism